Ljubav si ubio gade (You've Killed Love, You Scum) is the second studio album by Bosnian pop-folk singer Selma Bajrami. It was released in 1999 through the record label Nimfa Sound.

Track listing

References

1999 albums
Selma Bajrami albums
Nimfa Sound albums